Keenan Maurice Webb (born November 14, 1990), also known as DJ Suede the Remix God (or simply Remix God Suede), is an American hip hop record producer and songwriter.

Background 
Keenan Maurice Webb was born on November 14, 1990 in Douglas, Georgia, where he also was raised. He kickstarted his interest in production at the age of 12, working on beats and remixes in his spare time. After graduating college, he gained attention on Vine, achieving a viral post with his remix of an iPhone 6 ringtone, which was shared across numerous social media platforms. Since the first viral remix, Webb has consistently released remix-after-remix, sampling familiar sounds or pop culture references.

Suede peaked at fame in late-2016 and early-2017 when he earned himself three charting Billboard songs, with "You Name It!," a Thanksgiving theme song which sampled vocals from the "Hold My Mule" sermon sung by Pastor Shirley Caesar, and received heavy promotion from Chris Brown to be turned into the #UNameIt challenge, "I Got Skills," a collaboration with the Backpack Kid, Russell Horning, and his most popular, "Cash Me Outside," which spent three weeks on the Hot 100, peaking at number 72. His other notable non-charting songs include a remix of "You About To Lose Yo Job" by Eklectik, in collaboration with IMarkkeyz. The video was originally created by Johnniqua Charles during a video of her being arrested at a nightclub by a security guard. The remix became a popular meme used during 2020 Black Lives Matter movements and the 2020 United States presidential election and was used on a skit on Saturday Night Live to mock Donald Trump's loss to Joe Biden. And a remix of "The F.U.N. Song" from SpongeBob SquarePants, which has amassed over 85 million views on YouTube.

Since going viral, Suede has produced music for YoungBoy Never Broke Again, Young Thug, Migos, 2 Chainz, Megan Thee Stallion and Juicy J, to name a few.

Discography

Singles

References

Notes

External links 
 DJ Suede the Remix God on Genius (website)
 DJ Suede the Remix God on YouTube

Living people
1998 births
Musicians from Georgia (U.S. state)
American hip hop record producers
People from Douglas, Georgia